The Lenny Breau Show was a Canadian music variety television series which aired on CBC Television in 1966.

Premise
Jazz guitarist Lenny Breau hosted this Winnipeg-produced series with Bob McMullin's house band.

Scheduling
This half-hour series was broadcast on Fridays at 8:00 p.m. from 12 August, to 9 September 1966.

References

External links
 

CBC Television original programming
1966 Canadian television series debuts
1966 Canadian television series endings
1960s Canadian variety television series